The Eredivisie ("Honour Division" or "Premier Division") is the highest level of professional football in the Netherlands. The league was founded in 1956, two years after the start of professional football in the Netherlands. As of the 2020–21 season, it is ranked the sixth-best league in Europe by UEFA.

The Eredivisie consists of 18 clubs. Each club meets every other club twice during the season, once at home and once away.

The winner of the Eredivisie claims the Dutch national championship. Ajax have won the most titles with 36. PSV Eindhoven are next with 24, and Feyenoord follow with 15. Since 1965, these three clubs have won all but three Eredivisie titles (the 1981 and 2009 titles went to AZ and FC Twente won in 2010). Ajax, PSV, and Feyenoord are known as the "Big Three" or "Traditional Top Three" of Dutch football. They are the only clubs in their current form to have never been relegated out of the Eredivisie. A fourth club, FC Utrecht, is the product of a 1970 merger between three of that city's clubs, one of which, VV DOS, had also never been relegated out of the Eredivisie.

From 1990 to 1999, the official name of the league was PTT Telecompetitie (after the sponsor, PTT Telecom), which was changed to KPN Telecompetitie (because PTT Telecom changed its name to KPN Telecom) in 1999 and to KPN Eredivisie in 2000. From 2002 to 2005, the league was called the Holland Casino Eredivisie. Since the 2005–06 season, the league has been sponsored by the Sponsorloterij (lottery), but for legal reasons its name could not be attached to the league (the Dutch government was against the name, because the Eredivisie would, after Holland Casino's sponsorship, yet again be sponsored by a company providing games of chance).

In August 2012, it was made public that tycoon Rupert Murdoch had secured the rights to the Eredivisie for 12 years at the expense of one billion euros, beginning in the 2013–14 season. Within this deal, the five largest Eredivisie clubs were to receive five million euros per year. In 2020, the Eredivisie was abandoned due to the COVID-19 pandemic.

History

From the foundation of the Dutch national football championship in 1898 until 1954, the title was decided through play-offs by a handful of clubs who had previously won their regional league. The competition was purely an amateur one; the Royal Dutch Football Association (KNVB) rejected any form of payment and suspended players who were caught receiving salary or transfer fees. The call for professional football grew in the early fifties after many national team members left to play abroad in search for financial benefits. The KNVB would usually suspend these players, preventing them from appearing for the Dutch national team. After the North Sea flood of 1953, the Dutch players abroad (mainly playing in the French league) organised a charity match against the France national team in Paris. The match was boycotted by the KNVB, but after the assembled Dutch players defeated the French (2–1), the Dutch public witnessed the heights that could be achieved through professional football. To serve the growing interest, a dissident professional football association (the NBVB) and league were founded for the 1954–55 season. On 3 July 1954, the KNVB met with a group of concerned amateur club chairmen, who feared the best players would join the professional teams. The meeting, dubbed the slaapkamerconferentie ('bedroom conference'), led to the Association reluctantly accepting semi-professionalism.

Meanwhile, both the KNVB and the NBVB started their separate competition. The first professional football match was contested between Alkmaar and Venlo. The leagues went on for eleven rounds, before a merger was negotiated between the two federations in November. Both leagues were cancelled and a new, combined competition emerged immediately. De Graafschap, Amsterdam, Alkmaar and Fortuna '54 from the NBVB were accepted to the new league. Other clubs merged, which led to new names like Rapid J.C., Holland Sport and Roda Sport. The first (semi-)professional league was won by Willem II. For the 1956–57 season, the KNVB abandoned the regional league system. The Eredivisie was founded, in which the eighteen best clubs nationwide directly played for the league title without play-offs. The inaugural members of the Eredivisie in 1956 were Ajax, BVC, BVV, DOS, EVV, Elinkwijk, SC Enschede, Feijenoord, Fortuna '54, GVAV, MVV, NAC, NOAD, PSV, Rapid J.C., Sparta, VVV '03 and Willem II. Ajax was the first team to claim the title that season. Below is a complete record of how many teams played in each season throughout the league's history;
 18 clubs: 1956–1962
 16 clubs: 1962–1966
 18 clubs: 1966–present

Current teams (2022–23)

Maps

Champions

* As Rapid JC.

Playoffs

European competition

Relegation

Attendance

Since the beginning of the league, there have been three clubs with an attendance much higher than the others: Ajax, PSV and Feyenoord. Clubs like Heerenveen, FC Utrecht and FC Groningen also have fairly large fanbases. The regular season average league attendance was just over 7,000 in 1990, but this figure has risen sharply over the years thanks to the opening of new stadiums and the expansion of existing ones nationwide. Average attendance for the 2018–19 season was 18,010, with Ajax having the largest (52,987) and Excelsior having the smallest (4,223). Ajax's figures however differ from those provided by the Johan Cruyff Arena since the club counts all tickets sold instead of the number of people going through the turnstiles.

All-time ranking (since 1956)
Last updated following the 2018–19 season

Player records

Appearances

Goals

Top scorers

Last updated following the 2021–22 season.

Media coverage

Eredivisie teams and major UEFA and FIFA competitions
The following sixteen international tournaments were won by Eredivisie teams:

 1970 European Cup Final – Feyenoord
 1970 Intercontinental Cup – Feyenoord
 1971 European Cup Final – Ajax
 1972 European Cup Final – Ajax
 1972 Intercontinental Cup – Ajax
 1973 European Cup Final – Ajax
 1973 European Super Cup – Ajax
 1974 UEFA Cup Final – Feyenoord
 1978 UEFA Cup Final – PSV
 1987 European Cup Winners' Cup Final – Ajax
 1988 European Cup Final – PSV
 1992 UEFA Cup Final – Ajax
 1995 UEFA Champions League Final – Ajax
 1995 UEFA Super Cup – Ajax
 1995 Intercontinental Cup – Ajax
 2002 UEFA Cup Final – Feyenoord

The UEFA Super Cup was founded by a Dutch reporter named Anton Witkamp and Ajax's 1973 win was the first time the tournament was contested officially.

Sponsorship names for seasons
 Eredivisie (1956–1990)
 PTT-Telecompetitie (1990–1999)
 KPN-Telecompetitie (1999–2000)
 KPN Eredivisie (2000–2002)
 Holland Casino Eredivisie (2002–2005)
 Eredivisie (2005–present)

See also

 Eerste Divisie
 KNVB Cup
 Johan Cruyff Shield
 List of Dutch football champions
 List of foreign players in the Eredivisie
 List of sports attendance figures – Eredivisie in a global context

References

External links

Eredivisie.nl – Official website 

 
1
Netherlands
Sports leagues established in 1956
1956 establishments in the Netherlands
Professional sports leagues in the Netherlands
|}